Lim Chai-Min (Hanja: 林採民 ; born 18 November 1990) is a South Korean footballer who plays as centre back for Jeju United.

Career
He signed with Seongnam Ilhwa on 7 December 2012. He made his debut in the league match against Gyeongnam FC on 19 May 2013.

References

External links 

1990 births
Living people
Association football central defenders
South Korean footballers
Seongnam FC players
Gangwon FC players
Gimcheon Sangmu FC players
K League 1 players
K League 2 players
Yeungnam University alumni